Družny is a settlement located in Belarus, located in the Puchavicki rajon in the Minsk Voblast. , its population was 9,038.

History

Personalities 
 Alyaksandr Krotaw (b. 1995), bіelarusian professional footballer.

Economic 
Near Družny located the Minsk 5 power station coal powered generating station. Originally the plant was built as the Minsk Nuclear Heat- and Power Plant, consisting of two VVER-1000 reactors. After the Chernobyl disaster, the plans were canceled.

References

External links